Donbaleh Rud-e Jonubi Rural District is a rural district (dehestan) in Dehdez District, Izeh County, Khuzestan Province, Iran. At the 2006 census, its population was 6,908, in 1,261 families.  The rural district has 27 villages.

References 

Rural Districts of Khuzestan Province
Izeh County